The Narberth Road and Maenclochog Railway was a Welsh light railway company in Pembrokeshire. Services started in January 1876.

Route

The  line ran from Clynderwen (formerly Narberth Road) on the Great Western Railway via Maenclochog to Rosebush in the Preseli Mountains. Its terminus at Rosebush served large slate quarries.

Takeover
The company was purchased by the North Pembrokeshire and Fishguard Railway in May 1894.

References

Pre-grouping British railway companies
Railway lines opened in 1876
Railway companies disestablished in 1894
Railway lines in Wales
Transport in Pembrokeshire